Hari is among the primary epithets of the Hindu preserver deity Vishnu, meaning 'the one who takes away' (sins). It refers to the one who removes darkness and illusion, the one who removes all obstacles to spiritual progress. 

The name Hari also appears as the 656th name of Vishnu in the Vishnu Sahasranama of the Mahabharata and is considered to be of great significance in Vaishnavism.

Etymology

The Sanskrit word "हरि" (Hari) is derived from the Proto-Indo-European root "*ǵʰel- to shine; to flourish; green; yellow"  which also gave rise to the Persian terms zar 'gold', Greek khloros 'green', Slavic zelen 'green' and zolto 'gold', as well as the English words yellow and gold.

The same root occurs in other Sanskrit words like haridrā, 'turmeric', named for its yellow color.

In Hinduism, beginning with Adi Sankara's commentary on the Vishnu sahasranama, hari became etymologized as derived from the verbal root  hṛ "to grab, seize, steal", in the context of Vaishnavism interpreted as "to take away or remove evil or sin", and the name of Vishnu rendered as "he who destroys samsara", which is the entanglement in the cycle of birth and death, along with ignorance, its cause;  compare hara as a name of Shiva, translated as "seizer" or "destroyer".

Other names of Hari

There are multiple names of Hari mentioned in the holy scriptures of Hinduism, such as the Bhagavad Gita and Mahabharata. A few names which are used quite frequently are:

 Vishnu
 Narayana
 Rama
 Krishna
 Madhava
 Damodara
 Govinda
 Gopala

In Indian religions

In Hinduism 
The Harivamsha ("lineage of Hari") is a text in both the Purana and Itihasa traditions.
 As the name of tawny-colored animals, hari may refer to lions (also a name of the zodiacal sign Leo), bay horses, or monkeys.  The feminine Harī  is the name of the mythological "mother of monkeys" in the Sanskrit epics.
 Harihara is the name of a fused deity form of both Vishnu (Hari) and Shiva (Hara) in Hinduism.
 Hari is the name of a class of gods under the fourth Manu (manu tāmasa, "Dark Manu") in the Puranas.
 Haridasa is the Hari-centered bhakti movement from Karnataka.
 In the Gaudiya Vaishnava tradition, Hari is a name of both Krishna and Vishnu, invoked in the Hare Krishna mahamantra (Hare could be a vocative form of Hari).
 Sri Hari an avatar of Vishnu liberated Gajendra in the puranic literature.

In Sikhism 
The name "ਹਰਿ" (Hari) is frequently used as a name for Waheguru in the Sri Guru Granth Sahib:ਹਰਿ ਹਰਿ ਹਰਿ ਹਰਿ ਨਾਮੁ ਹੈ ਗੁਰਮੁਖਿ ਪਾਵੈ ਕੋਇ ॥

Hari, Hari, Hari, Hari is the Name (of the Lord); rare are those who, as Gurmukh, obtain it. (SGGS, Ang.1313)In the Varan Bhai Gurdas, an early explanation and interpretation of Sikh theology, Bhai Gurdas also associates the name "ਹਰਿ" (Hari) in the form of Hari Krishan in the Dwapur Yuga with the letter "ਹ" (h) in "ਵਾਹਿਗੁਰੂ" (Waheguru).

However, in the context of the Sri Guru Granth Sahib, the name "Hari" refers to the one monotheistic God of Sikhism. Hari is the same god in Sikhism that is also known in Hinduism as well.

See also
 Vishnu
 Narayana
 Govinda
 Perumal
 Ishvara
 Purushottama
 Krishna

References

Rigveda
Shades of yellow
Titles and names of Krishna
Names of God in Hinduism